Francisco Vera (full name Francisco Javier Vera Manzanares, born in Colombia, 12 years old as of 7 November 2021) is a climate change activist from Colombia. He has received numerous death threats because of his activism. President Ivan Duque of Colombia has promised the government will find the 'bandits' behind Twitter messages threatening Francisco.

Francisco is the creator of Conversaciones con Francisco, an Instagram series of Instagram Live where he chats with relevant people around the world making a change.

Activism 
In November 2021 Francisco participated in the 2021 United Nations Climate Change Conference where he met Greta Thunberg. He has also met with Iván Duque Márquez, expresident of Colombia, to discuss the Escazú Agreement.

He is the founder of Guardianes por la Vida, a social movement of children fighting against climate change.

References 

Colombian activists
Child activists
2000s births
Living people